Lucas Hayward is a "charity figure", featured in the fifth season of the British television series The Undateables.

Early life 
Lucas was born with Oculoauriculofrontalnasal Syndrome (O.A.F.N.S.), Tracheo-Oesophageal Fistula (T.O.F.) and a dermoid in one of his eyes.
As a result of his unusual appearance he received increasing levels of bullying from other children at his school. In order to combat this increase in negative behaviour he had surgery to remove the dermoid and alter his nose appearance to look more like other peoples'. Though successful, the surgery reduced his eyesight, requiring him to wear glasses. Unfortunately the bullying continued to increase and even developed from verbal to physical abuse. 
Lucas "decided to make [school] a smaller part of [his] life" by joining external clubs and activities.

The charity Changing Faces unsuccessfully attempted to help Lucas at his primary school, however, after a short period of home-schooling they worked with his secondary school to put anti-bullying procedures in place.

Media presence 
In 2010, at the age of 13, Lucas wrote an article which appeared in the 25 January 2010 issue of The New Statesman, challenging the "unconscious ideas and assumptions" society has of people with disfigurements.

London 2012 Olympics 
On 3 July 2012, Lucas carried the Olympic Torch through part of Leicester on the 46th day of the Torch Relay. He carried the flame twice the normal distance (as the previous Torchbearer had dropped out for an unknown reason), "at roughly 7:50am" from Portsmouth Road to Vicarage Lane in Leicester.

References 

Living people
Participants in British reality television series
Place of birth missing (living people)
Year of birth missing (living people)